{{DISPLAYTITLE:C27H34O11}}
The molecular formula C27H34O11 (molar mass: 534.55 g/mol, exact mass: 534.2101 u) may refer to:

 Arctiin, a lignan
 Phillyrin, a lignan